Bandar railway station is a railway station on the Panskura–Haldia branch line in South Eastern Railway zone of Indian Railways. The railway station is situated at Ranichak More, Haldia in Purba Medinipur district in the Indian state of West Bengal. Bandar railway station serves Haldia Port areas.

History
The Howrah–Kharagpur line was opened in 1865 and Panskura-Durgachak line was opened in 1968, at a time when Haldia Port was being constructed. It was subsequently extended to Haldia. The Panskura–Haldia line including Bandar railway station was electrified in 1974–76.

References

Railway stations in Purba Medinipur district
Kharagpur railway division
Kolkata Suburban Railway stations
Transport in Haldia